Safarish Khan (born 31 March 1970) is a Pakistani boxer. He competed in the men's super heavyweight event at the 1996 Summer Olympics.

References

1970 births
Living people
Pakistani male boxers
Olympic boxers of Pakistan
Boxers at the 1996 Summer Olympics
Place of birth missing (living people)
Asian Games bronze medalists for Pakistan
Asian Games medalists in boxing
Boxers at the 1994 Asian Games
Medalists at the 1994 Asian Games
Super-heavyweight boxers
20th-century Pakistani people